Sofia Kawawa (12 August 1936 – 1994) was the founder of the Tanzania Women's Union (UWT). She was a member of the Tanganyika African National Union (TANU) party and later Chama Cha Mapinduzi (CCM).

Early life 
She was born in Masonya village in Tunduru District in Ruvuma. She studied at Masonya Primary and later completed her primary education in Tabora. In 1951 she married Rashid Kawawa who became the First Prime Minister of Tanganyika/Tanzania.

Politics 
She was among the first woman to join the TANU Party and to fight for the independence of Tanganyika.
She founded the Tanzania Women's Union (UWT) together with Bibi Titi Mohamed and went on to serve as the second chairperson from 1980 until 1990. The two women were the first activists to defend the rights of women in the country and they planted the seeds even before independence.

Philosophical and/or political views
Mama Kawawa and other activists had a slogan saying "It must be from the grassroots stems". She campaigned for women to be leaders. She helped Anna Abdallah and Gertrude Mongella become members of parliament.

This is the fruits of her work of planting 50/50 seeds that today activists and politicians want women and men's participation to be 50/50.

Published works
Militants, Mothers, and the National Family

References

Sources

External links
Militants, Mothers, and the National Family

1936 births
1998 deaths
Tanganyika African National Union politicians
Chama Cha Mapinduzi politicians
People from Dar es Salaam
Tanzanian feminists
20th-century Tanzanian women politicians
Tanzanian women writers